O'Fahey is an anglicised form of Ó Fathaigh. The patronym means "descendant of Fathaigh", whose name means "base" or "foundation". Cormac Ó Fathaigh is the first recorded bearer with the surname and is the purported ancestor of any Ó Fathaigh descendants. The surname largely became Fahey, with many variations.

Notable descendents 
 Pádraig Ó Fathaigh (1879–1976), Irish Republican Army intelligence officer

See also 
Anglicised versions of the surname:
 Fahey
 Fahie
 Fahy
 Fay (surname)

References 

Irish families
Irish-language surnames
Surnames of Irish origin